The Lake of Bays River is a river in Kenora District in Northwestern Ontario, Canada. It is in the Hudson Bay drainage basin and is a left tributary of the Sturgeon River.

Course
The river begins at an unnamed lake just west of Ontario Highway 599 and just west of the border with Thunder Bay District. It heads north, then west through Rome Lake, Gibraltar Lake, Malta Lake and Handcuff Lake to the Lake of Bays, where it takes in the left tributaries Dominion River and Bays River. It then heads north, and reaches its mouth at Conver Lake on the Sturgeon River. The Sturgeon River flows via the Marchington River, English River, Winnipeg River, and Nelson River to Hudson Bay.

Tributaries
Lake of Bays
Dominion River (left)
Bays River (left)

See also
List of rivers of Ontario

References

Sources

Rivers of Kenora District
Tributaries of Hudson Bay